The Gap is a suburb of the town of Mount Isa in the City of Mount Isa, Queensland, Australia.

Geography 
The Leichhard River flows north-south through the town of Mount Isa, dividing the suburbs of the town into "mineside" (west of the Leichhardt River) and "townside" (east of the Leichhardt River). The Gap is a "townside" suburb.

History 
The Gap was named by Queensland Place Names Board on 1 September 1973. On 16 March 2001 its status was changed from a locality to suburb.

References

External links 
 

City of Mount Isa
Suburbs in Queensland